Casimir is classically an English, French and Latin form of the Polish name Kazimierz.  Feminine forms are Casimira and Kazimiera. It means "proclaimer (from kazać to preach) of peace (mir)."

List of variations 
Belarusian: Казімір
Catalan: Casimir
Croatian: Kazimir, Kažimir
Czech: Kazimír
Esperanto: Kazimiro
Galician: Casemiro, Casamiro
German: Kasimir
Hungarian: Kázmér
Italian: Casimiro
Kazakh: Qasym or Kasym 
Latvian: Kazimirs 
Lithuanian: Kazimieras
Polish: Kazimierz
Portuguese: Casimiro
Romanian: Cazimir
Russian: Казимир
Serbian: Казимир/Kazimir
Slovak: Kazimír
Slovene: Kazimir
Spanish: Casimiro
Swedish: Casimir
Ukrainian: Казимир
Vietnamese: Casimirô, Caximia
English: Casimir

Royalty
 Casimir I of Poland, Polish name Kazimierz Odnowiciel (the Restorer) (1015–1058)
 Casimir II of Poland, Polish name Kazimierz Sprawiedliwy (the Just) (1138–1194)
 Casimir III of Poland, Polish name Kazimierz Wielki (the Great) (1310–1370)
 Casimir IV Jagiellon, Polish name Kazimierz Jagielończyk, Lithuanian name Kazimieras I Jogailaitis (1427–1492)
 Casimir I, Duke of Pomerania-Demmin (after 1130–1180)
 Casimir II, Duke of Pomerania-Demmin (c. 1180–1219)
 Casimir III, Duke of Pomerania-Stettin (1348–1372)
 Casimir IV, Duke of Pomerania-Stolp (1351–1377)
 Saint Casimir (1458–1484), patron saint of Lithuania and Poland
Casimir I of Opole (1178/79–1230), Polish duke
Casimir, Margrave of Brandenburg-Bayreuth between 1515 and 1527
John Casimir of the Palatinate-Simmern (1543–1592), Count Palatine of Simmern and regent of the Electorate of the Palatinate from 1583 to 1592
Friedrich Casimir, Count of Hanau-Lichtenberg (1623–1685)
Charles Edward Louis John Casimir Sylvester Severino Maria Stuart ("Bonnie Prince Charlie"), Jacobite pretender to the thrones of England, Scotland, France and Ireland

People with name Casimir, Kazimir, etc.
Casimir, Comte de Montrond (1768–1843)
Casimiro de Abreu, Brazilian poet and novelist, adept of the "Ultra-Romanticism" movement
Kázmér Batthyány, Hungarian politician who served as Minister of Foreign Affairs during the Hungarian Revolution of 1848
Kasimir Bileski, Canadian philatelist and stamp-dealer based in Winnipeg, Manitoba, Canada
Casimir Bizimungu, Rwandan politician
Count Kasimir Felix Badeni, Minister-President of the Austrian half of the Austro-Hungarian Empire from 1895 until 1897
Casimir Delavigne, French poet and dramatist
Casimiro Díaz, Spanish friar of the Augustinian order (vows in 1710), who accompanied the first Spanish expedition to the Cordillera
Casimir Dudevant, French nobleman
Casimir Ehrnrooth, Finnish magnate, former chairman of Nokia Corporation
Casimir Funk (Kazimierz Funk), Polish biochemist, generally credited with the first formulation of the concept of vitamins in 1912, which he called vital amines or vitamines
Casimiro Gennari, Italian Cardinal
Kasimir Graff, German astronomer
Jean Casimir Félix Guyon, French surgeon and urologist born on Ile-Bourbon (Réunion)
 Kazimír Gajdoš, Slovak footballer
 Casimir Gzowski (1813–1898), engineer and acting Lieutenant Governor of Ontario
Casimir Lefaucheux, French gunsmith
Casimir Lewy, Polish-born British philosopher
Casimir Liberski, Belgian jazz-musician who plays piano and electric keyboard
Casimir Loxsom, American middle-distance runner who specialises in the 800 metres
Kazimir Malevich, Russian artist, pioneer of geometric abstract art and the originator of the Avant-garde Suprematist movement
Casimir Ney, French composer and one of the foremost violists of the 19th century
Casimir Oyé-Mba, Gabonese politician
Casimir Pierre Perier, French statesman, president of the council during the July Monarchy
Casimir Pilenas, private investigator and British intelligence agent
Casimir Pulaski, Polish soldier, member of the Polish nobility and politician who has been called "the father of American cavalry"
Casimir Reuterskiöld, Swedish sport-shooter who competed in the 1920 Summer Olympics
Kazimir Sas, Australian film and television actor, known for his work on children's television series
Casimir Stapko (1913–2006), American portrait painter
Kazimir Strzepek, cartoonist living in Seattle, Washington
Casimir Zagourski (Polish: Kazimierz Zagórski), pioneering photographer of Central African peoples and customs
Casimir Zeglen, Polish pastor and inventor of a bullet-resistant cloth

People with name Kazimierz
Kazimierz Ajdukiewicz, Polish philosopher and logician
Kazimierz Bartel, Polish mathematician and politician who served as Prime Minister of Poland three times between 1926 and 1930
Kazimierz Brandys, Polish essayist and writer of film scripts
Kazimierz Brodziński, Polish Romantic poet
Kazimierz Deyna, Polish football player, one of the best marksmen in the history of world football
Kazimierz Fabrycy, Polish general, member of the Polish Legions in World War I, fought in the Polish Soviet War
Kazimierz Fajans, American physical chemist of Polish origin and a pioneer in the science of radioactivity
Kazimierz Górecki, Polish sprint canoer who competed in the mid-1970s
Kazimierz Konopka, Polish activist
Kazimierz Kord, Polish conductor
Kazimierz Kuratowski, Polish mathematician and logician, one of the leading representatives of the Warsaw School of Mathematics
Kazimierz Kutz, Polish film director, author, journalist and politician, one of the representatives of the Polish Film School and a deputy speaker of the Senate of Poland
Kazimierz Marcinkiewicz, Polish conservative politician who served as Prime Minister of Poland from 31 October 2005 to 14 July 2006
Kazimierz Michałowski, Polish archaeologist and Egyptologist, and the founder of Nubiology
Kazimierz Orlik-Łukoski, Polish military commander and one of the Generals of the Polish Army murdered by the Soviet Union in the Katyń massacre of 1940
Kazimierz Plater, Polish chess master
Kazimierz Poniatowski, Polish Szlachcic, podkomorzy wielki koronny (1742–1773), generał wojsk koronnych, Knight of the Order of the White Eagle
Kazimierz Prószyński, Polish inventor in the field of cinema
Kazimierz Przerwa-Tetmajer, Polish poet, novelist, playwright, journalist and writer, member of the Young Poland movement
Kazimierz Sabbat, President of Poland in Exile from 8 April 1986 until his death, 19 July 1989, after serving (from 1976) as Prime Minister of the Polish Government in Exile
Maciej Kazimierz Sarbiewski (1595–1640), the first Polish poet to become widely celebrated abroad
Kazimierz Serocki, Polish composer and one of the founders of the Warsaw Autumn contemporary music festival
Kazimierz Siemienowicz, Polish general of artillery, gunsmith, military engineer, artillery specialist and pioneer of rocketry
Kazimierz Sosnkowski, Polish independence fighter, politician and Polish Army general
Kazik Staszewski, Polish rock musician, leader of the band Kult
Kazimierz Świtalski, Polish officer, politician, and a Prime Minister of Poland
Kazimierz Michał Ujazdowski, Polish politician
Kazimierz Urbanik (1930–2005), Polish mathematician
Kazimierz de Weydlich, Polish chess master
Kazimierz Zarankiewicz, Polish mathematician

People with surname Casimir

 Artur von Casimir (1907–2005), German pilot
 Auguste Casimir-Perier, French diplomat; son of Casimir Pierre Perier and father of President Jean Casimir-Perier
 Ernst Casimir, count of Nassau-Dietz and Stadtholder of Friesland, Groningen and Drenthe
 J. R. Ralph Casimir (1898–1996), Dominican poet, editor and pan-Africanist organiser
 Jean Casimir-Perier, French politician, fifth president of the French Third Republic
 Kirsten Casimir (born 1978), West Indian cricketer
 Hendrik Casimir (1909–2000), Dutch physicist
 Raymond Casimir (born 1976), West Indian cricketer

Other

Casimir (dinosaur), a character of the French TV show l'Île aux enfants

See also

 Kazimierz (disambiguation)
 Kazimiera, feminine form and notable bearers
 Kazimieras, Lithuanian form and notable bearers
 Casmir (disambiguation), a surname
 Casemiro

References

Polish masculine given names